Angat Buhay Foundation, incorporated as Angat Pinas, Inc., is a non-profit, non-governmental organization based in the Philippines. It was founded and officially launched on July 1, 2022, a day after its founder Leni Robredo's term as Vice President of the Philippines expired.

The foundation aims to continue the anti-poverty and pandemic response programs started during Robredo's tenure as vice president, which all went under the same umbrella name of "Angat Buhay" (a Tagalog word meaning 'improve life's condition'). The foundation is focused on four key areas: health, education, food security, and disaster risk response. It was launched with a two-day street party and art exhibit, the proceeds from which were made part of the foundation's program funds. On June 30, 2022, the foundation announced that its first project would be a dormitory for the indigent students of Southern Luzon State University (SLSU) in Quezon.

In July 2022, a statement by the Ateneo de Manila University announced that a new species of water scavenger beetle, discovered in Ifugao by Enrico Gerard Sanchez, will be named after Angat Buhay's anti-poverty program with the scientific name Anacaena angatbuhay.

References 

Non-profit organizations based in the Philippines
Organizations established in 2022